Suter's Tavern, also known officially as The Fountain Inn, was a tavern located in Georgetown, which later became part of Washington, D.C., and it served as Georgetown's best-known hostelry until the emergence of several newer taverns in the 1790s.  

John Suter established the tavern in 1783 in Georgetown on Fishing Lane, near today's intersection of 31st and K Streets, NW. Though the precise location of the tavern is not entirely clear, it is known to have been located about two blocks southwest of the Old Stone House, where Suter's son, John Jr., resided. The building that housed the tavern has been described as a small building, one and half stories, with a large inn yard in back to accommodate coaches and wagons.  Suter's Tavern was the location of meetings between George Washington, Andrew Ellicott, and Major Pierre L’Enfant to plan what would one day become the nation’s capital  Suter continued to operate this tavern until his death in 1794, after which his wife continued running it until early 1796. By February of that year, Clement Sewall had taken over operations of the Fountain Inn, but by December 1796, he had left to operate the newly built City Tavern (now the City Tavern Club).  Eventually, Suter's  Fountain Inn became an oyster-house and ultimately disappeared without record.

George Washington and other notable residents frequented the tavern, which was the site of land deals involved in establishing Washington as the "Federal City".

References

History of Washington, D.C.
Georgetown (Washington, D.C.)
1783 establishments in the United States
American companies established in 1783